The Rose Bowl Game is an annual American college football bowl game, usually played on January 1 (New Year's Day) at the Rose Bowl in Pasadena, California. When New Year's Day falls on a Sunday, the game is played on Monday, January 2.  The Rose Bowl Game is nicknamed "The Granddaddy of Them All" because it is the oldest currently operating bowl game. It was first played in 1902 as the Tournament East–West football game, and has been played annually since 1916. Since 1945, it has been the highest attended college football bowl game. The game is a part of the Pasadena Tournament of Roses Association's "America's New Year Celebration", which also includes the historic Rose Parade. Winners of the game received the Leishman Trophy, named for former Tournament of Roses presidents, William L. Leishman and Lathrop K. Leishman who played an important part in the history of this game.

The Rose Bowl Game has traditionally hosted the conference champions from the Big Ten and Pac-12 conferences (or their predecessors). Since 2002, the Rose Bowl Game has occasionally deviated from its traditional matchups for use in "national championship" systems. In 2002 and 2006 (the 2001 and 2005 seasons), under the Bowl Championship Series (BCS) system, the Rose Bowl was designated as its championship game, and hosted the top two teams determined by the BCS system. Beginning in 2015, the Rose Bowl has been part of the College Football Playoff (CFP) as one of the New Year's Six bowls—the top six major bowl games in the national championship system—hosting one of the semifinal games every three years. During non-CFP years, the Rose Bowl reverts to its traditional Pac-12/Big Ten matchup, unless the champions from those conferences are selected to play in the College Football Playoff.

History
Originally titled the "Tournament East–West football game", the first Rose Bowl was played on January 1, 1902, starting the tradition of New Year's Day bowl games. The football game was added in 1902 to help fund the cost of the Rose Parade. The inaugural game featured Fielding H. Yost's dominating 1901 Michigan team, representing the East, which crushed a previously 3–1–2 team from Stanford University, representing the West, by a score of 49–0 after Stanford quit in the third quarter. Michigan finished the season 11–0 and was crowned the national champion. Yost had been Stanford's coach the previous year. The game was so lopsided that for the next thirteen years, the Tournament of Roses officials ran chariot races, ostrich races, and other various events instead of football.  But, on New Year's Day 1916, football returned to stay as the State College of Washington (now Washington State University) defeated Brown University in the first of what was thereafter an annual tradition.

Tournament Park and Rose Bowl stadium

Tournament Park was found to be unsuitable for the increasingly large crowds gathering to watch the game and a new, permanent home for the game was commissioned.

The Rose Bowl stadium, designed after the Yale Bowl in New Haven, hosted its first "Rose Bowl" game on January 1, 1923. The name of the stadium was alternatively "Tournament of Roses Stadium" or "Tournament of Roses Bowl", until the name "Rose Bowl" was settled on before the 1923 game.

The stadium seating has been reconfigured several times since its original construction in 1922. For many years, the Rose Bowl stadium had the largest football stadium capacity in the United States, eventually being surpassed by Michigan Stadium in 1998. The maximum stated seating capacity was 104,594 from 1972 to 1997. Capacity was lowered after the 1998 game; the 2006 game, which was also the BCS championship game, attracted a crowd of 93,986; and there were 94,118 spectators at the 2011 game between TCU and Wisconsin. As of 2012, the Rose Bowl is number seven on the list of American football stadiums by capacity with a current official seating capacity of 92,542 and is still the largest stadium that hosts post-season bowl games. The Rose Bowl is also the only CFP bowl game that is held in a non-NFL stadium.

Team selection 1916–1946
In the game's early years, except during World War I, the Rose Bowl always pitted a team—not necessarily the conference champion—from the Pacific Coast Conference (PCC), the predecessor of the current Pac-12 Conference, against an opponent from the Eastern U.S. During the last two years of World War I, teams from military bases met in the Rose Bowl. During its history, a number of notable matchups have been made with the top football teams and top coaches of the time. These include the 1925 game, with Knute Rockne's Notre Dame and their Four Horsemen, against "Pop" Warner's Stanford; the 1926 edition saw the Alabama Crimson Tide's win over Washington; and 1940 featured Howard Jones' USC Trojans against Bob Neyland's Tennessee Volunteers. During this period, there were ten games in which undefeated teams were matched.

World War II  – 1942 venue change to Durham, North Carolina

After the Japanese attack on Pearl Harbor on December 7, 1941, and a series of attacks on West Coast shipping beginning on December 18, there were concerns about a possible Japanese attack on the West Coast. The Rose Parade, with a million watchers, and the Rose Bowl, with 90,000 spectators, were presumed to be ideal targets for the Japanese. Lieutenant General John L. DeWitt recommended that the Rose Parade and Rose Bowl festivities be cancelled. The Rose Bowl committee originally planned to cancel the game. On December 16, Duke University invited the game and Oregon State to Duke's home stadium in Durham, North Carolina. After the 1942 Allied victory in the Battle of Midway and the end of the Japanese offensives in the Pacific Theater during 1942, it was deemed that a large portion of the West Coast was no longer vulnerable to attack, and the Rose Bowl game continued on in the Rose Bowl Stadium. Few Georgia fans were able to make the trip to the 1943 Rose Bowl because of wartime travel restrictions. There were a large number of military servicemen in attendance. The Tournament of Roses parade itself still was not held in 1943 because of the war.

Big Nine–PCC agreement
During World War II, many college football schools had dropped some conference opponents and instead played football against local military base teams. Many colleges could not even field teams because of the draft and manpower requirements. After the war was over, demobilization and the G.I. Bill enabled returning servicemen to attend college. The 1946 season was the first true post-war college football season with travel restrictions lifted and civilian college opponents returning to schedules.

The Big Nine and PCC were of the same accord when it came to treating players as amateurs, as compared to the semi-professional status that the Southern Universities proposed. Also, the Big Nine and PCC both had the same attitudes towards desegregation and allowing African-Americans to play football. Many other universities were still segregated. None of the Southeastern Conference schools had an African American athlete until 1966. The Cotton Bowl, Orange Bowl, and Sugar Bowl would not be integrated until 1948, 1955, and 1956 respectively.

The Big Nine agreed in 1946, after eight years of negotiating over payments, rules, and ticket allocations, to a five-year exclusive deal with the Rose Bowl to send the conference champion to meet the PCC champion. UCLA, USC, Minnesota and Illinois all voted against it. The 1947 Rose Bowl, with UCLA meeting Illinois, was the first game under this agreement.

Big Ten–AAWU/Pac-8/10/12 agreement
When the PCC dissolved prior to the 1959 season following a pay-for-play scandal in 1958, there was no official agreement in force. The Tournament of Roses selected from the former members of PCC and invited Washington, the first champion of the newly formed Athletic Association of Western Universities (AAWU), to play Big Ten champion Wisconsin in the 1960 Rose Bowl. The Big Ten authorized its members to accept any Rose Bowl invitation at their discretion.

The AAWU signed an agreement with the Rose Bowl that remained in force from the 1961 Rose Bowl until the advent of the BCS era in 1998.  In 1962, after Minnesota changed its vote against pursuing a new agreement (resolving a 5–5 voting deadlock which had prevented any new negotiations for years), a Big Ten agreement was finalized, which went into effect with the 1963 Rose Bowl and lasted until the BCS era.

While the Big Ten supplied the "East" representative and the PCC, AAWU, or Pac-8/10 supplied the "West" representative from the 1947 Rose Bowl to the BCS era, an "exclusive" Rose Bowl agreement did not exist throughout this period. In particular, the Big Ten was not part of any agreement for at least the 1961 and 1962 games. In particular, the 1961 Big Ten champion Ohio State, declined the invitation to play in the 1962 game without penalty.

The AAWU used "Big Five", "Big Six", and "Pacific-8" as unofficial nicknames (each reflecting the number of conference members).  It officially adopted the "Pacific-8" name for the 1968 season. The name changed to "Pacific-10" with the arrival of Arizona and Arizona State in 1978, its last official name change prior to the formation of the BCS in 1998.  The Big Ten Conference retained the same name throughout this period, even though it had eleven members by the start of the BCS era because of the addition of Penn State in 1990.

Both conferences had a "no repeat" rule in force for a number of years. Under this rule, any team that had appeared in the Rose Bowl game the previous season could not go, even if they were the conference champion. The notable exception was Minnesota playing in the 1961 and 1962 games during the period when the conference agreements were in a state of flux.  Second-ranked Ohio State did not participate because its faculty council voted it down, allowing Minnesota to return. The PCC's rule went into effect following California's third straight defeat in 1951 and ended with conference's disbandment in the summer of 1959; it affected the 1955 and 1958 games. The Big Ten abolished their rule in 1972; it had recently affected the 1966 game. Southern California played in four consecutive Rose Bowl games from 1967 to 1970; Ohio State played in four straight from 1973 to 1976.

Both conferences also had "exclusive agreements" with the Rose Bowl game, in the sense that member schools were not allowed to play in any other bowl game. Both conferences abolished this rule before the 1975 NCAA Division I football season.  As a result, Michigan and USC were allowed to play in the 1976 Orange Bowl and the 1975 Liberty Bowl, respectively.

Bowl Championship Series

As of the 1998 season, with the creation of the Bowl Championship Series (BCS), team selection for the Rose Bowl was tied to the other three BCS bowls, although in any given year the Rose Bowl still attempted, if possible, to maintain the traditional Pac-10 (Pac-12 after the addition of Utah and Colorado in 2011) versus Big Ten format (though if the champion from either or both conference was ranked BCS #1 or #2, they were allowed into the national championship game and were replaced by another team, typically from the same conference as the team being replaced). Twice in this era, the Rose Bowl had served as the BCS championship game.

The 2002 game served as the BCS championship game between the BCS No. 1–ranked Miami, then a member of the Big East Conference, and the BCS No. 2–ranked Nebraska, then a member of the Big 12 Conference.  The Nebraska selection as the BCS No. 2 team was controversial because Oregon was ranked No. 2 in both the AP and Coaches Polls, while Nebraska was ranked No. 4 in both polls and did not play in its conference championship game (No. 3 Colorado, who would play Oregon in that year's Fiesta Bowl, did and won the Big 12's automatic bid to the BCS).  This prevented a West Coast team playing in the Rose Bowl for the first time, and it also marked the first matchup since 1946 not to feature the traditional pairing of Pac-10 vs. Big Ten teams.

The 2006 Rose Bowl game featured offensive powerhouses Texas, riding a 19-game winning streak, and USC, which entered the game with a 34-game winning streak and two Heisman Trophy winners. Texas won 41–38. The game had a television viewership of 35.6 million, the highest for college football contest since the 1987 Fiesta Bowl between Penn State and Miami.

On two other occasions during the BCS era, Rose Bowl participation had expanded beyond the Big Ten and Pac-10. The 2003 Rose Bowl couldn't select Big Ten co-champion and automatic qualifier Ohio State, who finished No. 2 in the BCS and thus received a bid to the Fiesta Bowl to play for the national championship.  The Rose Bowl was poised to select Big Ten co-champion Iowa as an at-large in order to preserve the traditional Big Ten/Pac-10 match up.  However, the Orange Bowl, which selected ahead of the Rose Bowl that year, chose the Hawkeyes.  As a result, the Rose Bowl featured the first appearance by Oklahoma, who faced Pac-10 Champion Washington State. The 2005 game featured Texas of the Big 12 Conference, selected, amid some controversy, over California of the Pac-10, marking the second time a West Coast team did not make the Rose Bowl. The controversy was the result of the BCS computer rankings which elevated Texas over California.  Texas went on to defeat Michigan in the 2005 game, featuring a four-touchdown performance by Vince Young, foreshadowing his 467-yard performance a year later in the 2006 defeat of USC that won the National Title for Texas.

The 2004 game is also noteworthy. In this game, USC defeated Michigan, 28–14, thus earning the top ranking in the AP Poll and a share of the national championship with BCS champion LSU. USC, despite being No. 1 in the AP poll, did not qualify for the BCS championship game because of their standing in the BCS system.

The second BCS-era Rose Bowl arrangement ran from 2004 through 2014. The Big Ten and Pac-12 (the new name of the Pac-10) retained their bids, but a provision was inserted mandating that the first time that either conference could not fill their bid (because a school from the Big Ten or Pac-12 qualifies for the BCS National Championship Game), and if a non-BCS conference school qualified, the Rose Bowl was required to take that school.  As a result, Texas Christian University (TCU) became the first team from a non-automatic qualifying conference to play in the Rose Bowl in the BCS era.  The 2010 TCU Horned Frogs finished their second consecutive regular season at 12–0, were back-to-back champions of the Mountain West Conference, and ranked No. 3 in the final BCS Poll.  TCU defeated No. 5 Wisconsin 21–19 in the 2011 Rose Bowl. TCU's appearance satisfied the 'first time' clause of the agreement.

The 100th Rose Bowl Game featured a traditional pairing of Big Ten champion versus Pac-12 champion, with Michigan State playing against Stanford on January 1, 2014.  Michigan State won the game, 24–20.

The Bowl Championship Series format ended with the 2014 BCS National Championship Game, played at the Rose Bowl Stadium on January 6.

College Football Playoff
The BCS was replaced in 2014 by the College Football Playoff, which selects four teams for two national semifinal games, leading to a championship game. As part of the arrangement, the Rose Bowl game functions as a semifinal playoff game every three years. In years when the Rose Bowl is not hosting a semifinal, it takes the Pac-12 and Big Ten champions, unless one or both teams qualify for the semifinals, in which case they are replaced by another team from the same conference.

The first game under the new arrangement was played on January 1, 2015, and was known as the College Football Playoff semifinal at the Rose Bowl Game presented by Northwestern Mutual. It featured the Oregon Ducks of the Pac-12 Conference and the Florida State Seminoles, the first Atlantic Coast Conference team to participate in the Rose Bowl. Oregon defeated Florida State, 59–20, ending the Seminoles' 29-game winning streak, which dated back to the end of the 2012 season. As a result, Oregon advanced to the 2015 College Football Playoff National Championship played on January 12. The 59 points were a new Rose Bowl Game scoring record for a team.

The 2016 Rose Bowl featured Pac-12 champions Stanford against Big Ten West Division champions Iowa. Stanford defeated Iowa 45–16, scoring 35 points in the first half, the most points ever scored in the first half of a Rose Bowl. Big Ten champions Michigan State defeated Iowa 16–13 in the Big Ten championship Game, but lost 38–0 to Alabama in a CFP semifinal on New Year's Eve. There was some controversy over the selection of the Big Ten's Rose Bowl representative, given that both Iowa and Ohio State finished their seasons with only one loss, both losing to Michigan State. In the end, the College Football Playoff Committee ranked Iowa ahead of Ohio State, which led to Iowa's first Rose Bowl berth since 1991. Iowa was ranked fifth in the final College Football Playoff rankings, and Stanford sixth, meaning that the 2016 Rose Bowl featured the strongest matchup that was not part of the College Football Playoff.

In the 2018 Rose Bowl, the Georgia Bulldogs (12–1) defeated the Oklahoma Sooners (12–1), 54–48, in double overtime in a semifinal playoff game to advance to the 2018 College Football Playoff National Championship game. It was the first Rose Bowl game to go into overtime.

COVID-19 — 2021 venue change to Arlington, Texas 

In early December 2020, it was announced that the 2021 Rose Bowl, a CFP semifinal game, would be contested behind closed doors without fans, due to California Governor Gavin Newsom's orders in response to the COVID-19 pandemic in California. This was met with criticism, including from Notre Dame head coach Brian Kelly, who wanted players' families to be allowed to attend. On December 19, it was reported that a request by the Tournament of Roses to the State of California, requesting a special exemption to allow some fans to attend, was denied. Later that day, the CFP announced that the semifinal game would be moved from Pasadena to AT&T Stadium in Arlington, Texas. It was not immediately clear if the game would still be called the Rose Bowl. A press release from the Pasadena Tournament of Roses stated:
"It is not yet determined if the CFP semifinal in Dallas will be called the CFP Semifinal at the Rose Bowl Game presented by Capital One. The name is a part of the Master License Agreement and is co-owned by the Pasadena Tournament of Roses and the City of Pasadena."

On December 30, the City of Pasadena and the Tournament of Roses announced that the game in Arlington could use the Rose Bowl name. The only prior instance of the game being played outside of Pasadena was the 1942 edition.

Sponsorship and broadcasting rights

Sponsorship

For many years the Rose Bowl eschewed sponsorship, but in 1999, it became "The Rose Bowl Game presented by AT&T." Unlike the other bowl games, the sponsor was not added to the title of the game, but instead as a presenter. In 2002 it was branded The Rose Bowl Game presented by PlayStation 2. From 2003 to 2010, after the agreement with Sony expired, the game was presented by Citi.

In June 2010, Citi decided to end sponsorship of the Rose Bowl games, including the National Championship game. In October 2010, HDTV maker Vizio signed a 4-year contract to be the official sponsor of the Rose Bowl games through 2014.  After Vizio declined to renew sponsorship in 2014, financial services giant Northwestern Mutual became the new presenting sponsor. From 2015 to 2020, the game was sponsored by Northwestern Mutual and officially known as the Rose Bowl Game presented by Northwestern Mutual.

The 2021 edition, sponsored by Capital One, was officially known as the Rose Bowl Game presented by Capital One. As the sponsor of the 2021 Orange Bowl, Capital One became the first company to sponsor two New Year's Six bowls. Capital One continued their sponsorship of the game, with the 2022 edition officially being named the Rose Bowl Game presented by Capital One Venture X after the company's travel rewards credit card.

Prudential Financial became the new sponsor of the Rose Bowl in 2023.

Broadcasters

The Rose Bowl was first televised in 1947 on W6XYZ, an experimental station out of Los Angeles that would eventually become KTLA. The 1952 game was the first nationally televised bowl game and the first nationally televised college game of any sport. From 1952 to 1988, the Rose Bowl was televised by NBC at 2 p.m. PST, and in most years was the only New Year's Day bowl airing at that time.  The 1956 Rose Bowl has the highest TV rating of all college bowl games, watched by 41.1% of all people in the US with TV sets. The 1962 game was the first college football game broadcast in color. Television ratings for the Rose Bowl declined as the number of bowl games increased. The other bowl games also provided more compelling match-ups, with higher-ranked teams.  In 1988, NBC gave up the broadcast rights, as the television share dropped in 1987 below 20.

From 1989 to 2010, the game was broadcast on ABC, usually at 2 p.m. PST. The first 9-year contract in 1988 started at about $11 million, which is what NBC had been paying. The 2002 Rose Bowl was the first broadcast not set at the traditional 2:00pm West Coast time. The visual of the afternoon sun setting on the San Gabriel Mountains on New Year's Day is recognized as an important part of the tradition of the game.

The 2005 edition was the first one broadcast in HDTV. Beginning in 2007, Fox had the broadcast rights to the other Bowl Championship Series games, but the Rose Bowl, which negotiated its own television contract independent of the BCS, had agreed to keep the game on ABC.
Beginning with the 2010 season, ESPN (majority-owned by ABC's parent company, The Walt Disney Company) now broadcasts all the BCS/CFP games, including the Rose Bowl game.  The game is also broadcast nationally by ESPN Radio and by ESPN International for Latin America. In 2013, ESPN Deportes provided the first Spanish language telecast in the U.S. of the Rose Bowl Game.

The Rose Bowl game contract with ESPN was extended on June 28, 2012, to 2026, for a reportedly $80 million per year.

Game results
Winners appear in boldface while italics denote a tie game.
Team rankings are taken from the AP Poll (inaugurated in 1936, prior to the 1937 Rose Bowl) before each game was played.

Source:

Future games

 denotes College Football Playoff semifinal game

Appearances and win–loss records
The below tables list results by teams competing as members of the Big Ten conference, Pac-12 conference, and all other participants. Included in Pac-12 results are teams who competed as a member of the Pacific Coast Conference, Pacific-8 Conference, or Pacific-10 Conference—predecessors of the Pac-12.

Updated through the January 2023 edition (109 games, 218 total appearances).

Current Big Ten teams that have not represented the Big Ten in the Rose Bowl are Maryland, Nebraska, and Rutgers. Current Pac-12 teams that have not represented the Pac-12 in the Rose Bowl are Arizona and Colorado.

 Some teams who are members of the Pac-12 and Big Ten made appearances while not members; thus, the following results are included in the "Other teams" table:
 Penn State's January 1923 loss predates their joining of the Big Ten
 Nebraska's January 1941 and January 2002 losses predates their joining of the Big Ten
 Stanford's January 1902 loss predates formation of the Pacific Coast Conference, predecessor of the Pac-12
 Washington State's January 1916 win predates formation of the Pacific Coast Conference, predecessor of the Pac-12

‡ The Southeastern Conference has one current member and two former members who made additional appearances in the Rose Bowl while those schools were not members of the SEC. Alabama made additional appearances in 1926, 1927, and 1931 before becoming a charter member of the SEC in 1932. Another SEC charter member, Georgia Tech, made an appearance in 1929, and left the SEC in 1964. Tulane, also a charter member, made an appearance in 1932, prior to the SEC's establishment in December of that year. Tulane left the SEC in 1966.

Frequent participants

Among Pac-8/10/12 and Big Ten schools, the record for longest drought since a team's last Rose Bowl appearance is held by California (1959), followed by Minnesota (1962), Oregon State (1965), and Indiana (1968).

Among Pac-8/10/12 and Big Ten schools who have played in at least one Rose Bowl, the record for the longest period since a win is held jointly by Indiana and Nebraska, who have never won, followed by Washington State (1916), Cal (1939), Oregon State (1942), Northwestern (1949), and Iowa (1959). As of 2016, head coaches Howard Jones (5–0) and John Robinson (4–0) lead the list of undefeated Rose Bowl records.

Archie Griffin of Ohio State and Brian Cushing of USC are the only players to ever start in four Rose Bowl games. Legendary coach Woody Hayes led Ohio State to the Rose Bowl from 1973 to 1976, while USC head coach Pete Carroll led the Trojans to the Rose Bowl from 2006 to 2009.

Current members of the Pac-12 or the Big Ten to have not appeared in the Rose Bowl are Arizona (who joined the then-Pac-10 in 1978) and Colorado (who joined the Pac-12 in 2011), and Maryland and Rutgers (who both joined the Big Ten in 2014), though California appeared in the Rose Bowl only as a member of a predecessor league to the Pac-12. Similar to Cal, Nebraska played in the 1941 and 2002 games, but was not a member of the Big Ten Conference at these times. Idaho and Montana, who were members of the Pacific Coast Conference from 1922 until 1958 and 1950 respectively, never finished near the top in the PCC football standings.  Former Big Ten member Chicago withdrew from the league prior to the bowl arrangement being set.

USC has played the most Big Ten schools in the Rose Bowl. As of 2016, the only opponents remaining for the Trojans are Iowa, Minnesota, Nebraska, and the two newest Big Ten schools that have yet to appear in the Rose Bowl: Maryland and Rutgers.  Ohio State and Michigan are tied for playing the most schools in the Pac-12 in the Rose Bowl. The remaining opponents for the Buckeyes are Oregon State, Washington State, and the two Pac-12 schools that have yet to appear in the Rose Bowl: Arizona and Colorado.  The remaining opponents for the Wolverines other than Arizona and Colorado are Oregon and Utah.

Common matchups
The most frequent Rose Bowl matchup is USC vs Michigan, occurring for the eighth time in 2007, with USC holding a 6–2 advantage (including rare meetings outside the Rose Bowl, USC leads this series 6–4). The next most frequent matchup is USC–Ohio State, occurring for the seventh time in 1985, with USC holding a 4–3 advantage.

Matchups that have occurred more than once:

Top-ranked teams
No. 1 ranked teams at the end of the regular season that have played in the Rose Bowl game are listed below:

 1955: No. 1 Ohio State defeated No. 17 USC, 20–7
 1961: No. 6 Washington defeated No. 1 Minnesota, 17–7
 1963: No. 1 USC defeated No. 2 Wisconsin, 42–37
 1966: No. 5 UCLA defeated No. 1 Michigan State, 14–12
 1968: No. 1 USC defeated No. 4 Indiana, 14–3
 1969: No. 1 Ohio State defeated No. 2 USC, 27–16
 1973: No. 1 USC defeated No. 3 Ohio State, 42-17
 1976: No. 11 UCLA defeated No. 1 Ohio State, 23-10
 1980: No. 3 USC defeated No. 1 Ohio State, 17–16
 1998: No. 1 Michigan defeated No. 8 Washington State, 21–16
 2002 (BCS National Championship Game): No. 1 Miami defeated No. 4 Nebraska, 37–14
 2004: No. 1 USC defeated No. 4 Michigan, 28–14
 2006 (BCS National Championship Game): No. 2 Texas defeated No. 1 USC, 41–38
 2021 (CFP Semifinal Game): No. 1 Alabama defeated No. 4 Notre Dame, 31–14

Twice in a season
Of the 24 bowl rematches of regular season games, five have taken place in the Rose Bowl. In three of those instances, the same team won both the regular season game and the Rose Bowl Game. UCLA won three of those five Rose Bowl games, including both instances in which a different team lost the regular season game but won the Rose Bowl Game.
 1956 Iowa 14, Oregon State 13
1957 Rose Bowl rematch: Iowa 35, Oregon State 19
 1965 Michigan State 13, UCLA 3
1966 Rose Bowl rematch: UCLA 14, Michigan State 12
 1975 Ohio State 41, UCLA 20
 1976 Rose Bowl rematch: UCLA 23, Ohio State 10
 1982 UCLA 31, Michigan 27
 1983 Rose Bowl rematch: UCLA 24, Michigan 14
 1987 Michigan State 27, USC 13
 1988 Rose Bowl rematch: Michigan State 20, USC 17

Game arrangements

Beginning with the 1947 Rose Bowl, the Pacific Coast representative was the home team, and the Big Nine representative was the visitor. This arrangement would alternate each year. The stadium seating started with the Big Nine representatives in the end zone, but eventually was set with the Big Ten fans and team on the West (press box) side, and Pacific-10 fans and team on the East side. The home team wears their darkest home jerseys, and the visiting team wears the white visiting jerseys. There have been exceptions to the uniform arrangement: UCLA wore their home jerseys, light blue, in the 1962, 1966, and 1976 Rose Bowl games, with the Big Ten opponent also wearing their home uniforms.

From 1947 through 2001, the Big Ten team was the home team in odd-numbered years, and the Pac-10 team was the home team in even-numbered years. In 2003, Washington State was the home team, as a non-Big Ten or Pac-10 school (Oklahoma of the Big 12) was the opponent; the same applied in 2005, when Michigan played another Big 12 school, Texas.

Beginning with the 2002 Rose Bowl, Nebraska was home, with team and fans on the East sideline. From 2006 through 2013, the home team had been the team with the highest BCS season ending ranking. For the 2005 Rose Bowl, the Michigan team was on the East sideline; Texas was the visiting team and was on the West sideline. For the 2006 Rose Bowl, USC was the home team and Texas was the visiting team on the West sideline. Traditionally, the Big Ten (or its BCS replacement) is on the West side (press box) and the Pac-12 team is on the East side.

During the BCS era, the institution with the higher BCS ranking performed the national anthem, and performed first at halftime. With the exception of BCS championship years, the National Anthem was performed by the band. In BCS Championship years, a performer was invited to sing the Anthem, the last being LeAnn Rimes in 2006. The Rose Bowl does not have other performers (including notable recording artists) during the halftime show besides the school marching bands. As part of the television contract, a portion of each band's halftime performance is shown on television. Each school and each conference are allocated television spots to advertise. For the 100th game on January 1, 2014, Merry Clayton, Lisa Fischer, Judith Hill and Darlene Love sang the national anthem in honor of the song's 200th anniversary. This was the first time in Rose Bowl history that the anthem was performed by singers rather than by a marching band. Today, the institution with the higher ranking by the CFP selection committee performs the national anthem and performs first at halftime.

The coin toss was usually presented by the grand marshal of the Rose Parade or the president of the Pasadena Tournament of Roses Association (if the grand marshal was unable to attend the game).

Player of the Game award
The Rose Bowl's most valuable player is presented the Player of the Game award. The Helms Athletic Foundation created the honor, which was first awarded in the 1940s. Helms executive director Bill Schroeder polled a Helms Hall Board composed of sportswriters to make the selection. The modern award selection continues to be made in collaboration with the national media covering the game.

Player of the Game honors were also awarded retroactively all the way back to the 1902 Rose Bowl.

Occasionally, the award has been shared by two players. Four players have been named the Player of the Game of more than one Rose Bowl: Bob Schloredt, Washington (1960, 1961), Charles White, USC (1979, 1980), Ron Dayne, Wisconsin (1999, 2000), and Vince Young, Texas (2005, 2006).

Player of the Game awards, 1902, 1916–2004

Player of the Game awards, 2005–present

Beginning with the 2005 Rose Bowl, Player of the Game awards have been given to both an offensive and defensive player.

Source:

Game records

Note: When there is a tie, the most recent one will be listed.

Rose Bowl Hall of Fame
Inductees (by year)
 1989 – C.W. "Bump" Elliott, Michigan; W.W. "Woody" Hayes, Ohio State; Howard Jones, USC; Jim Plunkett, Stanford
 1990 – Archie Griffin, Ohio State; Bob Reynolds, Stanford; Neil Snow, Michigan; Wallace Wade, Brown, Alabama, & Duke; Charles White, USC
 1991 – Rex Kern, Ohio State; John McKay, USC; Ernie Nevers, Stanford; Roy Riegels, California; Bob Schloredt, Washington; John Sciarra, UCLA; Russell Stein, Washington & Jefferson; Charley Trippi, Georgia; Ron Vander Kelen, Wisconsin; George Wilson, Washington
 1992 – Frank Albert, Stanford; Bob Chappuis, Michigan; Sam Cunningham, USC; Bill Daddio, Pittsburgh; Bob Griese, Purdue; Hollis Huntington, Oregon & Mare Island Marines; Shy Huntington, Oregon; Elmer Layden, Notre Dame; Jim Owens, Washington
 1993 – Frank Aschenbrenner, Northwestern; Dixie Howell, Alabama; Don Hutson, Alabama; Curly Morrison, Ohio State; Brick Muller, California; Julius Rykovich, Illinois; Bo Schembechler, Michigan; O. J. Simpson, USC; Bob Stiles, UCLA; Buddy Young, Illinois
 1994 – Vic Bottari, California; Jim Hardy, USC; Don James, Washington; Bob Jeter, Iowa; Lay Leishman, Tournament of Roses; Pat Richter, Wisconsin; Henry Russell "Red" Sanders, UCLA
 1995 – Gary Beban, UCLA; Dick Butkus, Illinois; Harry Gilmer, Alabama; Pat Haden, USC; Al Krueger, USC; Doyle Nave, USC; Ted Shipkey, Stanford
 1996 – Eric Ball, UCLA; Pete Beathard, USC; John Ferraro, USC; Stan Hahn, Tournament of Roses; John Ralston, Stanford; Bill Tate, Illinois
 1997 – Terry Donahue, UCLA; Jim Grabowski, Illinois; Warren Moon, Washington; Erny Pinckert, USC; Ken Ploen, Iowa; Sandy Stephens, Minnesota
 1998 – Jack Crabtree, Oregon; Don Durdan, Oregon State; J.K. McKay, USC; Rick Neuheisel, UCLA; Bill Nicholas, Tournament of Roses; Butch Woolfolk, Michigan
 1999 – Al Hoisch, UCLA; Keith Jackson, ABC Sports; Dave Kaiser, Michigan State
 2000 – Johnny Mack Brown, Alabama; Marv Goux, USC
 2001 – No inductees
 2002 – Ambrose "Amblin' Amby" Schindler, USC; Mel Anthony, Michigan
 2003 – Harriman Cronk, Tournament of Roses; Danny O'Neil, Oregon; John Robinson, USC
 2004 – Alan Ameche, Wisconsin; Rudy Bukich, USC; Wayne Duke, Big Ten; Jim Stivers, Tournament of Roses
 2005 – Richard N. Frank, Lawry's Restaurants (Beef Bowl); Curt Gowdy, Sports Broadcaster
 2006 – Steve Emtman, Washington; Rube Samuelsen, Sports Journalist; Jeff Van Raaphorst, Arizona State
 2007 – Pete Johnson, Ohio State; Tom Ramsey, UCLA; Dennis Swanson, Television Executive
 2008 – Keyshawn Johnson, USC; Virgil "Virg" Lubberden, USC (administrator); Chuck Ortmann, Michigan
 2009 – Barry Alvarez, Wisconsin; Tom Hansen, Pacific-10 Conference; John Hicks, Ohio State
 2010 – Brad Budde, USC; Hayden Fry, Iowa; Leroy Keyes, Purdue
 2011 – Ron Dayne, Wisconsin; Dick Enberg, NBC; George Fleming, Washington
 2012 – John Cooper, Arizona State and Ohio State; Brian Griese, Michigan; and Ron Yary, USC
 2013 – Lloyd Carr, Michigan; Orlando Pace, Ohio State; Lynn Swann, USC
 2014 – Knute Rockne, Notre Dame; Dick Vermeil, UCLA and Ki-Jana Carter, Penn State
 2015 – Mark Brunell, Washington; Jim Muldoon (Pac-10); Fritz Pollard, Brown; and Tyrone Wheatley, Michigan
 2016 – Bobby Bell, Minnesota; Ricky Ervins, USC; Tommy Prothro, UCLA and Art Spander, UCLA
 2017 – Mack Brown, Texas; Cade McNown, UCLA; Charles Woodson, Michigan; and Dr. Charles West, Washington & Jefferson
 2018 – George Halas, Great Lakes Navy; Randall McDaniel, Arizona State; Pop Warner, Stanford; Vince Young, Texas
 2019 – Eddie Casey, Harvard; Cornelius Greene, Ohio State; Matt Leinart, USC; Jacque Robinson, University of Washington
 2020 – None
 2021 – Anthony Davis, USC; Jim Delany, Big Ten Conference; Ron Simpkins, Michigan
 2022 – Hugo Bezdek, Oregon and Penn State; Darryl Dunn, Rose Bowl Stadium; Vince Evans, USC; Lorenzo White, Michigan State

All-Century Class
The Rose Bowl Game All-Century Class was announced on December 28, 2013.

They are:
 1900s–1910s: George Halas (Great Lakes Navy)
 1920s: Ernie Nevers (Stanford)
 1930s: Don Hutson (Alabama) and Howard Jones (USC)
 1940s: Charley Trippi (Georgia)
 1950s: Woody Hayes (Ohio State)
 1960s: John McKay (USC)
 1970s: Archie Griffin (Ohio State)
 1980s: Bo Schembechler (Michigan)
 1990s: Ron Dayne (Wisconsin)
 2000s: Vince Young (Texas)
 2010s: Montee Ball (Wisconsin)

In addition to being named as All-Century representatives for their respective decades, John McKay and Archie Griffin were named the 100th Rose Bowl Game All-Century Coach and Player respectively.

The finalists:
 1900–1919: Paddy Driscoll (Great Lakes Navy, 1919), Neil Snow (Michigan, 1902) and George Halas (Great Lakes Navy, 1919)
 1920–1929: Ernie Nevers (Stanford, 1925), Elmer Layden (Notre Dame, 1925) and Johnny Mack Brown (Alabama, 1926)
 1930–1939: Millard "Dixie" Howell (Alabama, 1935), Don Hutson (Alabama, 1935) and Howard Jones (USC, 1930, 1932–33, 1939–40)
 1940–1949: Bob Chappuis (Michigan, 1948), Harry Gilmer (Alabama, 1946) and Charley Trippi (Georgia, 1943)
 1950–1959: Alan Ameche (Wisconsin, 1953), Bob Jeter (Iowa, 1959) and Woody Hayes (Ohio State, 1954, 1957, 1968, 1970, 1972–1975)
 1960–1969: Ron Vander Kelen (Wisconsin, 1963), O. J. Simpson (USC, 1968–69) and John McKay (USC, 1963, 1967–70, 1973–1975)
 1970–1979: Jim Plunkett (Stanford, 1971), Charles White (USC, 1979–1980) and Archie Griffin (Ohio State, 1973–1976)
 1980–1989: Don James (Washington, 1978, 1981–82, 1991–93), John Robinson (USC, 1977, 1979–80, 1996) and Bo Schembechler (Michigan, 1970, 1972, 1977–79, 1981, 1983, 1987, 1989–90)
 1990–1999: Barry Alvarez (Wisconsin, 1994, 1999, 2000 and 2013), Keyshawn Johnson (USC, 1996) and Ron Dayne (Wisconsin, 1999 and 2000)
 2000–2009: Matt Leinart (USC, 2004 and 2006), Vince Young (Texas, 2005–06) and Brian Cushing (USC, 2006–09)
 2010–2012: Terrelle Pryor (Ohio State, 2010), Tank Carder (TCU, 2011) and Montee Ball (Wisconsin, 2011–13)

Notes

Books
 America's New Year Celebration. The Rose Parade & Rose Bowl Game. Albion Publishing Group, Santa Barbara, California. 1999.
 Samuelsen, Rube. The Rose Bowl Game. Doubleday Company and Inc. 1951.
 Big Ten Conference football media guide. (PDF copy available at http://bigten.cstv.com.)
 Pacific-10 Conference football media guide. (PDF copy available at http://www.pac-10.org.)
 Malcolm, Moran, and Keith Jackson (foreword). The Rose Bowl: 100th: The History of the Granddaddy of Them All. Whitman Publishing, LLC, 06/01/2013. .

See also

 Great Rose Bowl Hoax
 List of college bowl games

References

Bibliography
 Gruver, Edward (2002), Nitschke. Lanham:Taylor Trade Publishing.

External links

 

 
Webarchive template wayback links
Bowl Championship Series
College football bowls
American football competitions in California
Annual events in California
Annual events in Los Angeles County, California
Annual sporting events in the United States
Events in Pasadena, California
New Year in the United States
Sports competitions in Pasadena, California
Tournament of Roses
Recurring sporting events established in 1902
1902 establishments in California
Arroyo Seco (Los Angeles County)
History of Pasadena, California
Capital One